The voiceless alveolar tap or flap is rare as a phoneme. The equivalent X-SAMPA symbol is 4_0.

The voiceless alveolar tapped fricative reported from some languages is actually a very brief voiceless alveolar non-sibilant fricative.

Features

Features of the voiceless alveolar tap or flap:

Its manner of articulation is tap or flap, which means it is produced with a single contraction of the muscles so that the tongue makes very brief contact.
Its place of articulation is dental or alveolar, which means it is articulated behind upper front teeth or at the alveolar ridge. It is most often apical, which means that it is pronounced with the tip of the tongue.

Occurrence

Alveolar

See also
Index of phonetics articles

Notes

References

External links
 
 

Alveolar consonants
Tap and flap consonants
Pulmonic consonants
Voiceless oral consonants
Central consonants